The Players Tour Championship 2012/2013 – Event 4 (also known as the 2012 Kay Suzanne Memorial Trophy and the 2012 Kay Suzanne Memorial Cup) was a professional minor-ranking snooker tournament that took place between 11 and 14 November 2012 at the South West Snooker Academy in Gloucester, England. On 12 August 2012 it was announced, that this will be the last professional event held at the venue.

Ronnie O'Sullivan was the defending champion, but he withdrew from the competition on 6 November 2012.

John Higgins won his 40th professional title by defeating Judd Trump 4–2 in the final.

Prize fund and ranking points
The breakdown of prize money and ranking points of the event is shown below:

1 Only professional players can earn ranking points.

Main draw

Preliminary rounds

Round 1 
Best of 7 frames

Round 2 
Best of 7 frames

Main rounds

Top half

Section 1

Section 2

Section 3

Section 4

Bottom half

Section 5

Section 6

Section 7

Section 8

Finals

Century breaks 

 145, 106, 104  Kurt Maflin
 143, 132, 123, 107, 106, 105, 105, 103, 102, 100  Judd Trump
 139  Dave Harold
 138, 138, 105  Ali Carter
 134  Graeme Dott
 132  Michael Holt
 129  Jimmy Robertson
 129  Mark Davis
 128, 121  Ding Junhui
 124  Andrew Higginson
 124  Nigel Bond
 123, 108, 101, 100  Gerard Greene
 121  David Gilbert
 119, 106  Barry Hawkins
 118, 102  John Higgins
 117  Gareth Allen
 116  Mark Selby
 113, 107, 105  Dominic Dale

 113  Liu Chuang
 112, 105  Anthony Hamilton
 112, 102, 101  Mark Allen
 112, 100  Michael White
 110  Alfie Burden
 110  Michael Wild
 109, 105  Thanawat Thirapongpaiboon
 107  Rod Lawler
 107  Joe Perry
 105  Chris Norbury
 104  Ben Woollaston
 103  Mark Joyce
 102  Ben Jones
 101  Adam Duffy
 101  Craig Steadman
 101  Jamie Jones
 100  Tony Drago
 100  Matthew Stevens

References

External links 
The Kay Suzanne Memorial Trophy 2012 pictures by MoniqueLimbos at Facebook

2012
4
2012 in English sport
November 2012 sports events in the United Kingdom